Numerous procedures performed on domestic animals are usually more invasive than purely cosmetic alterations, but differ from types of veterinary surgery that are performed exclusively for urgent health reasons. Such procedures have been grouped together under the technical term 'mutilatory' by the Royal College of Veterinary Surgeons in a report describing the reasons for their being conducted and their welfare consequences, and by others. 

The term mutilatory generally connotes some form of disfigurement or even maiming. There are multiple definitions and interpretations that carry varying degrees of emotional intensity. Merriam-Webster defines "mutilate" as "to cut up or alter radically so as to make imperfect", but gives a relatively mild example: "the child mutilated the book with his scissors". Animal rights advocates often pejoratively refer to these procedures as mutilations. PETA states that one issue with current forms of non-human animal treatment is that the animals "are mutilated and confined to tiny cages so that we can kill them and eat them." 

The Royal College of Veterinary Surgeons noted that the term mutilation is often an emotive one, having implications in common usage of maiming and disfigurement. They stated that there was no satisfactory alternative term that would suffice for their purposes. Their definition is a narrower one: "covering all procedures, carried out with or without instruments which involve interference with the sensitive tissues or the bone structure of an animal, and are carried out for non-therapeutic reasons."The following table contains procedures performed on domesticated animals that may or may not have a purported therapeutic purpose.

See also 

 Animal-borne bomb attacks
 Anti-tank dog
 Bat bomb
 Bile bear
 Cattle mutilation
 Cruelty to animals
 Mutilation
 Painted fish
 Project Pigeon

Notes

References 

Animal welfare
Cruelty to animals
Veterinary procedures